Kuzman Josifovski Pitu (Macedonian: Кузман Јосифовски – Питу; 23 June 1915 – 25 February 1944) was a Macedonian communist partisan and one of the organizers of the Peoples's Liberation Struggle in Macedonia who was declared a People's Hero of Yugoslavia.

Biography 
He was born in 1915 in Prilep and studied Faculty of Law in Belgrade from 1935. In 1938, he was elected as a member of the Communist Party of Yugoslavia. In 1939, he went back to Prilep, where he became a member of the Local Committee of the CPY and in September was elected a member of the Provincial Committee of the CPY for Macedonia. After Yugoslavia was occupied by the Axis forces in 1941, Kuzman was sent by CPY to Western Macedonia, which was occupied by Albanian and Italian forces. There he attended a number of local conferences and meetings dedicated to the organisation of the antifascist struggle in that area. In early 1943, Kuzman became a member of the Main headquarters of the People's liberation army and Partisan units of Macedonia.

On 25 February 1944, he went to Skopje (then annexed by the Kingdom of Bulgaria) for a secret meeting of the Central Committee of the Bulgarian Workers' Party. Bulgarian police discovered his location in the city and he was shot dead during the chase.

Legacy
He was named "Pitu" in Pitu Guli's honor. The house where he was born and lived is now a memorial museum dedicated to him. There are a few of his busts in several cities in North Macedonia. Also, a number of schools and streets in North Macedonia bear his name.

References

See also

 List of people from Prilep

1915 births
1944 deaths
People from Prilep
Yugoslav Partisans members
Macedonian communists
Recipients of the Order of the People's Hero